Vuosaari Harbour (Vuosaaren satama in Finnish; Nordsjö hamn in Swedish) is a seaport facility in Helsinki, Finland, opened in November 2008. It is also the 19th tallest building in Finland. 

The harbour, located in the suburb of Vuosaari in East Helsinki, handles goods traffic for the Greater Helsinki region, while passenger services remain in Helsinki city centre. Vuosaari Harbour has assumed the operations of two container harbours, West Harbour in the city centre and Sörnäinen Harbour, and will eventually also replace the oil harbour in Laajasalo. In addition, the railway depot in Pasila currently used by goods transport will be moved northwards. These processes release land for commercial and residential redevelopment.

The harbour has a total land area of 150 hectares, including 90 hectares of land reclaimed by filling the sea. There is also a 75-hectare business park next to the harbour. The harbour project also included the extension of Ring III to the new seaport and a new railway line to be used for transporting goods in and out of the harbour.

The Vuosaari harbour was built on the site of the former Vuosaari shipyard.

External links

 Port of Helsinki: Vuosaari Harbour
 Vuosaari Harbour project
 Plans for the redevelopment of the harbour areas at the Helsinki City Planning Department's projects website:
Kruunuvuorenranta (the oil harbour)
 Länsisatama (West Harbour)
 Sörnäistenranta-Hermanninranta (Kalasatama)

2008 establishments in Finland
Transport infrastructure completed in 2008
Buildings and structures in Helsinki
Geography of Helsinki
Ports and harbours of Finland
Vuosaari